Konrad Wirtinger von Landau (died 22 April 1363), known in Italy as Conte Lando, was a German military adventurer and condottiero who was active in north and central Italy.

He was born the eldest son of Count Eberardo III in the ancient Swabian village of Burg Landau near Ertingen in present-day Württemberg and held the title of Konrad II, Count of Landau.

He went to Italy in 1338, entered the service of the Lords of Venice and fought against the army of Verona led by Mastino II della Scala. In 1339 he joined the Compagnia di San Giorgio of Lodrisio Visconti to attack Milan, then under the control of Lodrisio's estranged brothers. After initial success their company was defeated at the Battle of Parabiago. In 1346, fighting for Venice against Milan, he was again on the losing side. In 1347, in the service of the Marquis of Saluzzo,  when attempting to counter the attack by the Milanese and the Marquis of Montferrat, he was forced to surrender to the enemy.

In 1348 he joined the Great Company of Werner von Urslingen and took part in an expedition sponsored by King Louis I of Hungary into Naples against Joanna I of Naples to avenge the killing of Louis's brother Andrew by the Neapolitans. In 1349 they won the Battle of Meleto against the Neapolitan barons which earned the company some 500,000 florins in booty and ransoms. He then spent the next few years fighting in various campaigns for different patrons in central Italy.

In 1354, after Urslingen had died and Fra' Moriale had taken over the leadership of the Great Company, Landau rejoined its ranks and fought in various conflicts with Pisa, Siena, Florence and Milan. When Fra' Moriale was captured and executed in Rome later that year Landau himself took command.

After further years of fighting for various sponsors his company came up in 1363 against the White Company led by Albert Sterz and John Hawkwood at the Battle of Canturino. During the battle the wounded Landau was captured and died of his injuries later in the day.

References

Article based on a translation of the equivalent articles on Italian and French Wikipedia.

Bibliography

  Jacques Le Goff, L'uomo medievale, Bari, Laterza, 1999. .
  Michael Mallet, Signori e mercenari. La guerra nell'Italia del Rinascimento, Bologna, Il Mulino, 1983. .
  Claudio Rendina, I capitani di ventura, Roma, Newton, 1999. .
  Ercole Ricotti, Storia delle compagnie di ventura in Italia, Athena, 1929.

1363 deaths
14th-century condottieri
People from Biberach (district)